Meher Abbasi, née Bokhari() is a Pakistani television anchorperson and host. After a high-profile stint at Dunya News and Dawn News, Bokhari is currently associated with Hum News since February 2021.

Early education and career
Bokhari started her career as a journalist and a host on TV news programs for SAMAA TV. She had a stint with Dunya News after departing from Dunya News, she joined Dawn News in 2013 as a talkshow anchorperson where she hosted her show NewsEye. In February 2021, she left Dawn News and joined Hum News. Bokhari was born in 1983 and during her early years, raised in Pakistan. She went abroad in pursuit of higher education, but later returned to pursue her professional career in Pakistan.

Scandals

2012 Interview Scandal 
On the 13th of June, 2012, Bokhari and co-host Mubashir Lucman on Dunya News, interviewed Malik Riaz, Pakistani property tycoon and owner of the Bahria Town Group, who had made a string of corruption accusations against Arsalan Iftikhar, son of the then Chief Justice of Pakistan Iftikhar Muhammad Chaudhry. One day after the interview aired, a recording of supposedly off-air conversations between Bokhari, Lucman, and Riaz during scheduled breaks of the interview surfaced on YouTube. The nature of the conversation and comments gave credence to the assertion that the entire interview was staged to benefit Malik Riaz by asking guided questions to give Riaz the opportunity to malign the then Chief Justice.

See also 
 SAMAA TV
 Dunya News

References 

Living people
Pakistani women journalists
Pakistani television talk show hosts
1984 births
University of Waterloo alumni